B Gata H Kei, titled Yamada's First Time: B Gata H Kei in the English dub, is an anime television series from the manga of the same title written by Yoko Sanri. It was produced by Hal Film Maker.  It premiered on the KBS and Tokyo MX television network on April 2, 2010, and ran weekly for 12 episodes. FUNimation has licensed the anime series, releasing it on DVD and Blu-ray on January 31, 2012, and later broadcasting it on the Funimation channel and uploading it to various broadband services.

Both theme songs are performed by Yukari Tamura, who voices the title character Yamada. A maxi single containing the two themes was released on April 28, 2010.

Episode list 
{| class="wikitable" style="width: 98%;"
|-
! style="width: 5%;" | No. 
! Title
! style="width: 15%;" | Original airdate
|-

|}

References

External links
B Gata H Kei official website'' 

B Gata H Kei